Ewa Grabowska-Gaczorek (born 8 September 1962 in Nowy Targ) is a Polish former alpine skier who competed in the 1984 Winter Olympics. She placed 13th in the Women's Slalom and 31st in the Women's Giant Slalom.

External links
 sports-reference.com

1962 births
Living people
Polish female alpine skiers
Olympic alpine skiers of Poland
Alpine skiers at the 1984 Winter Olympics
People from Nowy Targ
Sportspeople from Lesser Poland Voivodeship
20th-century Polish women